Valentino Lai (born 3 February 1984) is a former footballer who played as a midfielder. Born in Italy, Lai represented Sweden internationally.

Club career
Born in Cagliari, Italy, Lai started his career playing for Swedish club FBK Balkan at youth level, and subsequently Malmö FF. In 2001, he moved back to Italy playing for Venezia, where he made his Serie A debut. In 2002, he moved to Palermo, appearing just in one Serie B match. After two loan spells at the Serie B level, in Salernitana and Triestina, in June 2005 Lai decided to return in Sweden by signing a 2-years contract for Landskrona BoIS, playing in Superettan. Then he went to the Danish club Vejle Boldklub. In the winter of 2010, Valentino went to Apollon Limassol on a loan deal. After leaving Apollon Limassol in summer of 2010, Lai went back to Vejle BK.

International career
At international level, Lai also represented Sweden at U21 level.

References

External links

 Vejle Boldklub profile 
 

1984 births
Living people
People from the Province of Cagliari
Swedish footballers
Sweden under-21 international footballers
Italian footballers
Swedish people of Italian descent
Italian emigrants to Sweden
Malmö FF players
Vejle Boldklub players
Landskrona BoIS players
Venezia F.C. players
Palermo F.C. players
U.S. Salernitana 1919 players
U.S. Triestina Calcio 1918 players
Apollon Limassol FC players
Viborg FF players
Swedish expatriate footballers
Expatriate men's footballers in Denmark
Expatriate footballers in Italy
Expatriate footballers in Cyprus
Serie A players
Serie B players
Danish Superliga players
Allsvenskan players
KSF Prespa Birlik players
Association football midfielders
Footballers from Sardinia